Isaac Ekpo (born 22 October 1982) is a Nigerian professional boxer who has challenged three times for a super-middleweight world title between 2013 and 2018. As an amateur, he competed at the 2004 Summer Olympics.

Career
In 2004, Ekpo was a member of the Nigerian Olympic team, and was defeated in the first round by Utkirbek Haydarov from Uzbekistan.

References

1982 births
Olympic boxers of Nigeria
Living people
Boxers at the 2004 Summer Olympics
Super-middleweight boxers
Light-heavyweight boxers
Nigerian male boxers
African Games silver medalists for Nigeria
African Games medalists in boxing
People from Abuja
Competitors at the 2003 All-Africa Games
20th-century Nigerian people
21st-century Nigerian people